Robert Matthew Dewhurst (born 10 September 1971) is an English former professional footballer who made nearly 200 appearances in the Football League playing as a defender for Blackburn Rovers, Darlington, Huddersfield Town, Hull City, Exeter City and Scunthorpe United.

References

External links

1971 births
Living people
Sportspeople from Keighley
English footballers
Association football defenders
Blackburn Rovers F.C. players
Darlington F.C. players
Huddersfield Town A.F.C. players
Hull City A.F.C. players
Exeter City F.C. players
Scunthorpe United F.C. players
English Football League players